Little Whale Cay Berry Islands Airport  is a public use airport located on Little Whale Cay, the Bahamas.

See also
List of airports in the Bahamas

References

External links 
 Airport record for Little Whale Cay Berry Islands Airport at Landings.com

Airports in the Bahamas
Berry Islands